Suchanun Viratprasert (born 1 January 1983) is a Thai former professional tennis player.

Her career-high singles ranking is 172, which she reached in August 2004. Her career-high WTA doubles ranking is 357, set on 9 February 2004.

Career
Viratprasert made her first appearance in 2010 and received a wild card to the PTT Pattaya Open, but lost to Sesil Karatantcheva in the first round, 1–6, 5–7.

In her career, she won a total of nine singles titles and six doubles titles on the ITF Circuit.

Fed Cup
Viratprasert was also a regular competitor for the Thailand Fed Cup team, helping the team join the World Group II in 2005 and 2006, after beating Australia and Croatia in their play-off matches. In 2004, she helped the Thailand team gain promotion to World Group II, defeated the No. 1 Australian player and world No. 41 in three sets, 6–2, 1–6, 6–1. In 2005, she beat the Croatian world No. 96, Sanda Mamić in straight sets, 6–3, 7–6. Thailand finally lost to Croatia 2–3, but remained in World Group II. Viratprasert played the world No. 15, Nicole Vaidišová, in the opening rubber-match, but lost in three sets, 6–3, 2–6, 0–6. But on the next day of play, she beat the world No. 45, Iveta Benešová, 6–4, 6–4.

ITF Circuit finals

Singles: 14 (9–5)

Doubles: 8 (6–2)

External links
 
 
 

Suchanun Viratprasert
1983 births
Living people
Suchanun Viratprasert
Tennis players at the 2006 Asian Games
Suchanun Viratprasert
Suchanun Viratprasert
Suchanun Viratprasert
Southeast Asian Games medalists in tennis
Competitors at the 1999 Southeast Asian Games
Suchanun Viratprasert